Several unrelated groups of songbirds are called catbirds because of their wailing calls, which resemble a cat's meowing. The genus name Ailuroedus likewise is from the Greek for 'cat-singer' or 'cat-voiced'.

Australasian catbirds are the genera Ailuroedus and the monotypic Scenopooetes. They belong to the bowerbird family (Ptilonorhynchidae) of the basal songbirds:
 Ochre-breasted catbird  (Ailuroedus stonii)
 White-eared catbird (Ailuroedus buccoides)
 Tan-capped catbird (Ailuroedus geislerorum)
 Green catbird (Ailuroedus crassirostris)
 Spotted catbird (Ailuroedus melanotis)
 Huon catbird (Ailuroedus astigmaticus)
 Black-eared catbird (Ailuroedus melanotis)
 Arfak catbird (Ailuroedus arfakianus)
 Northern catbird (Ailuroedus jobiensis)

New World catbirds are two monotypic genera from the mimid family (Mimidae) of the passeridan superfamily Muscicapoidea. Among the Mimidae, they represent independent basal lineages probably closer to the Caribbean thrasher and trembler assemblage than to the mockingbirds and Toxostoma thrashers:
 Gray catbird, Dumetella carolinensis
 Black catbird, Melanoptila glabrirostris

The Abyssinian catbird (Sylvia galinieri) is found in Africa. It was previously considered represents a monotypic genus Parophasma.

Footnotes

References
 Barber, Brian R.; Martínez-Gómez, Juan E. & Peterson, A. Townsend (2004): Systematic position of the Socorro mockingbird Mimodes graysoni. J. Avian Biol. 35: 195–198.  PDF fulltext
 Hunt, Jeffrey S.; Bermingham, Eldredge; & Ricklefs, Robert E. (2001): Molecular systematics and biogeography of Antillean thrashers, tremblers, and mockingbirds (Aves: Mimidae). Auk 118(1): 35–55. DOI:10.1642/0004-8038(2001)118[0035:MSABOA]2.0.CO;2 PDF fulltext
 Rowland, Peter (2008): Bowerbirds. CSIRO Publishing.  Excerpt at Google Books

 
Articles containing video clips
Songbirds